The March 74A was an open-wheel formula racing car, designed, developed, and built by British manufacturer and constructor, March Engineering, for Formula 5000 racing, in 1974. It competed in both the European and U.S. F5000 championships. It did also compete in three non-championship Formula One World Championship Grand Prix in 1974, being driven by Mike Wilds and Ian Taylor.

References

March vehicles
Formula 5000 cars